Philip Remi Øgaard (born 6 April 1948) is a Norwegian cinematographer. Since 1983, Øgaard has photographed more than 30 feature films, and has come to be recognized as one of Norway's premier cinematographers.  He frequently collaborates with directors Martin Asphaug, Bent Hamer and Hans Petter Moland.

Øgaard has been commended for his tasteful and naturalistic lighting, and ability to effectively compose difficult shots, often utilising subtle but very precise movement.

Selected filmography
1988: Hotel St. Pauli
1988: Sweetwater
1989: En håndfull tid (A Handful of Time)
1990: Døden på Oslo S (Death at Oslo Central)
1993: Telegrafisten (The Telegraphist)
1994: Ti kniver i hjertet (Cross My Heart and Hope to Die)
1995: Kjærlighetens kjøtere (Zero Kelvin)
1998: En dag til i solen (Water Easy Reach)
1998: Glassblåserens barn (The Glass-blower's Children)
2000: Aberdeen
2002: Grabben i graven bredvid (The Guy in the Grave Next Door)
2003: Salmer fra kjøkkenet (Kitchen Stories)
2003: Lille frk Norge (The Beast of Beauty)
2004: Andreaskorset (The Crossing)
2004: Min misunnelige frisør (My Jealous Barber)
2005: Kim Novak badade aldrig i Genesarets sjö (Kim Novak Never Swam in the Lake of Genesaret)
2006: Gymnaslærer Pedersen (Pedersen: High-School Teacher)
2019: Cold Pursuit

Awards
1988: The Film Critics' Award from Norsk Filmkritikerlag (Norwegian Critics' Guild), for Hotel St. Pauli and Sweetwater
1990: The Aamot-statuet, FILM&KINO honorary award
1999: Guldbagge from Svensk filminstitutt (Swedish Film Institute) Guldbagge Awards, for The Glass-blower's Children 
2000: Bronze Frog at the Camerimage festival, Poland, for Aberdeen 
2003: Award for Best Cinematography at the Valladolid International Film Festival, for Kitchen Stories

References

 Philip Øgaard dossier Snurrfilm.no 

Footnotes

External links
 
 

Norwegian cinematographers
1948 births
Living people
Place of birth missing (living people)
Best Cinematographer Guldbagge Award winners